Colonel Edmund Hegan Kennard VD FRGS (14 October 1834 – 9 July 1912) was an English Conservative politician who sat in the House of Commons in two periods between 1868 and 1885.

Kennard was the son of John Peirse Kennard and his wife Sophia Chapman. He was educated at Balliol College, Oxford, and became captain in the 8th Hussars.

At the 1868 general election Kennard was elected Member of Parliament (MP) for Beverley. The election was declared void on 11 March 1869. No writ was issued to replace the members and the constituency was disenfranchised by an Act which received Royal assent on 4 July 1870. The novelist Anthony Trollope was one of the defeated candidates in this final corrupt election for which Beverley was disfranchised, and drew on his experience directly for his description of the Percycross election in his novel Ralph the Heir, and also told the story in his Autobiography. Kennard was elected MP for Lymington in 1874 and held the seat until 1885.

Kennard became Honorary Colonel of the 15th Middlesex Rifle Volunteers and was ADC the Lord-Lieutenant of Ireland.

Kennard lived at Great Tangley Manor, Guildford, Surrey, where he died at the age of 77 on 9 July 1912.

Kennard married Agnes Hegan, daughter of Joseph Hegan, in January 1868. Their daughter Victoria married Frederick Ponsonby, 1st Baron Sysonby. Agnes, Mrs Hegan Kennard, published a translation from the Magyar of Maurus Jokai's 1872 work Az arany ember (The Man with the Golden Touch) in 1888 as Timar's Two Worlds.

References

External links
 

1834 births
1912 deaths
Conservative Party (UK) MPs for English constituencies
UK MPs 1868–1874
UK MPs 1874–1880
UK MPs 1880–1885
8th King's Royal Irish Hussars officers
Fellows of the Royal Geographical Society
Alumni of Balliol College, Oxford